Monika Piesliakaitė (born 2 February 1995) is a Lithuanian footballer who plays as a defender for MFK Žalgiris and the Lithuania women's national team.

Career
Piesliakaitė has been capped for the Lithuania national team.

References

External links
 Monika Piesliakaitė at Lietuvos Futbolas

1995 births
Living people
Lithuanian women's footballers
Lithuania women's international footballers
Women's association football defenders